towhead may refer to:
A person with light blond hair
A river island, usually a sandbar with trees
A novel by Sarah Pratt McLean Greene